Ahluwalia is a surname native to the Punjab region of India. It is derived from the words "Ahlu" (a village in Lahore) and "walia" (a Punjabi-language adjectival suffix). It was first adopted by the Sikh Kalal chief Jassa Singh, the leader of the Ahluwalia misl. The surname was later adopted by many others, including the members of the Kalal caste who were not his descendants, leading to the formation of the Ahluwalia caste.

Notable people who bear the surname Ahluwalia include:

 Ashim Ahluwalia, Indian film director and screenwriter
 Dolly Ahluwalia, Indian actress and costume designer
 H. P. S. Ahluwalia, Indian mountaineer
 Harry Ahluwalia, Indian actor
 Iloosh Ahluwalia, Indian businesswoman
 Isher Judge Ahluwalia, Indian economist
 Jasbina Ahluwalia, American matchmaker
 Jassa Ahluwalia, English actor
 Jassa Singh Ahluwalia, Sikh Confederacy leader
 Kiran Ahluwalia,  Indo-Canadian singer
 Kiranjit Ahluwalia, Indian women's rights activist
 Manraj Ahluwalia, English cricketer
 Montek Singh Ahluwalia, Indian economist and civil servant
 Poonam Ahluwalia, Indian social entrepreneur
 S. S. Ahluwalia, Indian politician
 Sukhdev Ahluwalia, Indian film director
 Shabir Ahluwalia,  Indian television actor
 Waris Ahluwalia, Indian-American designer

References 

Sikh names
Indian surnames
Surnames of Indian origin
Toponymic surnames
Punjabi-language surnames
People from Lahore